Air Materiel Command (AMC) was a United States Army Air Forces and United States Air Force command.  Its headquarters was located at Wright-Patterson Air Force Base, Ohio.  In 1961, the command was redesignated the Air Force Logistics Command with some of its functions transferred to the new Air Force Systems Command.

History
The logistics function can be traced before the earliest days of the Air Service, when the Equipment Division of the U.S. Army Signal Corps established a headquarters for its new Airplane Engineering Department at McCook Field, Dayton, Ohio.

Airplane Engineering Department
The Airplane Engineering Department was established by the Equipment Division of the U.S. Army Signal Corps in 1917 for World War I experimental engineering.  The department had a 1917 Foreign Data Section, and the Airplane Engineering Department was on McCook Field at Dayton, Ohio.  McCook Field established the Air School of Application in 1919 and after WW I, the department was renamed the Airplane Engineering Division on August 31, 1918, under Lt Col Jesse G. Vincent (Packard co-engineer of the 1917 V-12 Liberty engine) to study and design American versions of foreign aircraft.  The division merged in 1926 with the Air Service's Supply Division (formed by 1919) to form the Materiel Division (Air Corps).  In 1920, the Engineering Division's Bureau of Aircraft Production completed the design of the Ground Attack, Experimental, (GAX) aircraft built as the Boeing GA-1, and designed the VCP-1 that won the initial Pulitzer Race in 1920 at Roosevelt Field (the division also designed the TP-1 and TW-1).

Materiel Division
The Materiel Division was set up near Dayton, Ohio on January 15, 1926. The Materiel Division, controlled by the Office of the Chief of Air Corps (OCAC), possessed many characteristics of a major command. It brought together four major functions performed previously by three organizations: research and development (R&D), procurement, supply, and maintenance.

With the construction of nearby Wilbur Wright Field, McCook Field was closed on April 1, 1927, and was subsequently demolished after its assets moved to the new Wright Field, the latter serving as the Air Corps', and later the Army Air Forces', principal R&D center from 1927 to 1947, including the Physiological Research Laboratory which opened in 1935.  By August 22, 1935, the division operated an Army Aeronautical Museum at Wright Field, and by November 22, 1935, had an "Industrial War Plans Section".  F.B. Vose became the Materiel Division commander on October 19, 1940, with the division employing procurement inspectors at Wright Field the same year. The division had four Field Service Sections: San Antonio, Fairfield, Middletown, and Sacramento.

Then-Brigadier General Benjamin Foulois had a year as Chief of the Materiel Division at Wright Field from June 1929 to July 1930.

The Air Corps Maintenance Command was established under the Materiel Division on June 25, 1941 - less than a week after the creation of the USAAF itself on June 20, 1941 - to control supply and maintenance and retained the "Air Corps" designation that remained in effect for the USAAF's training and logistics units. 
On December 11, 1941, with United States newly engaged in World War II, these four functions were divided between two organizations.

Air Service Command

Maintenance Command was redesignated Air Service Command and kept responsibility for supply and maintenance functions.

The chief of the Air Service Command, Brig. Gen. Henry J. F. Miller, was charged with supervision in the United States of all AAF activities pertaining to storage and issue of supplies procured by the Air Corps and with overhaul, repair, maintenance, and salvage of all Air Corps equipment and supplies beyond the limits of the first two echelons of maintenance. The command was directed to compile AAF requirements for Air Corps and other supplies, to procure equipment and supplies needed for the operation and maintenance of AAF units, to prepare and issue all technical orders and instructions regarding Air Corps materiel, and to exercise technical control* over air depots outside of the continental limits of the United States. In addition, ASC received responsibility for coordination with the Army technical services in the supply and maintenance of equipment and supplies procured by them for the use of the AAF. The new command was separated from the Materiel Division but remained a part of the Office of the Chief of Air Corps.

Between October 1941 and March 1942 the Air Service Command remained under the jurisdiction of the Chief of the Air Corps. Immediately after the beginning of the war it moved its headquarters to Washington, where it began operations on December 15, 1941. But a large portion of the headquarters organization remained at Wright Field, where it carried on the greater part of the command's activities.
On December 15, 1942, its headquarters moved back to Dayton, establishing itself at Patterson Field, immediately adjacent to Wright Field.

On March 9, 1942, the Air Service Command now became one of the major AAF commands, with relatively clear lines of responsibility
and authority. Four air service area commands (San Antonio, Fairfield, Middletown, and Sacramento?), successors to the maintenance wings (and field service sections, originally activated in 1940?), had been activated in December 1941 to supervise the depots in given geographical areas. The depots, of which there were eleven by April 1942, became the centers of depot control areas, which directed the activities of subdepots within defined geographical limits. Unfortunately, the boundaries of some of the depot control areas overlapped those of air service areas, and since the depots were the real focal points of supply and maintenance activities, the air service areas never attained the status of fully functioning ASC subcommands. The air service areas were disbanded on February 1, 1943, to be succeeded by air depot control area commands, which were simply the eleven former depot control areas under a new name. The elimination of the four air service areas was apparently justified by subsequent operations; according to Maj. Gen. Walter H. Frank, commander of the ASC, the step proved "most beneficial."

In May 1943 the air depot control area commands were redesignated air service commands with appropriate geographical designations, and from then to the end of the war the ASC conducted its operations in the continental United States through its eleven air service commands, each serving a separate geographical area. These air service commands included the Middletown Air Service Command (Olmsted Field, Middletown, Pennsylvania), Mobile ASC, Ogden Air Service Command, Oklahoma City Air Service Command, Rome Air Service Command, Sacramento Air Service Command, the San Antonio Air Service Command, the San Bernardino Air Service Command, Warner Robins Air Service Command, Warner Robins, as well as five-six others. In 1944 the air service commands were redesignated air technical service commands.

The Materiel Division was assumed responsibility for R&D and procurement, and was redesignated Air Corps Materiel Command on April 1, 1942. This became Air Force Materiel Command in April 1942; Materiel Command in April 1943, and AAF Materiel Command on January 15, 1944.
On July 17, 1944, Air Service Command and AAF Materiel Command were placed under a new organization, AAF Materiel and Services.
On August 31, 1944, AAF Materiel and Services was redesignated Army Air Forces Technical Service Command.

The 4000th Army Air Forces Base Unit (Command) was among units assigned directly to AAFTSC when it was established at Wright-Patterson Field on April 1, 1944.

Air Technical Services Command

Army Air Forces Technical Service Command was redesignated Air Technical Service Command  (ATSC) on July 1, 1945.

By 1945, 14 bases in the United States were home to Air Technical Service Commands: Newark, New Jersey; Fairfield, California; Miami, Florida; Middletown, Pennsylvania; Mobile, Alabama; Ogden, Utah; Oklahoma City, Oklahoma; Oakland, California; Rome, New York; Sacramento, California; San Antonio, Texas; San Bernardino, California; the Spokane Air Technical Service Command at Spokane Army Air Field, Washington State; and Warner Robins, Georgia. (e.g., Chico AAF transferred to ATSC on October 15, 1944).  In 1945, planning began for a separate United States Air Force as an independent service, and in January 1946, General of the Army Eisenhower and Army Air Forces General Spaatz agreed on an Air Force organization of seven major commands, including the Air Technical Service Command.  ATSC centers were also renamed, e.g., the Kelly Field Logistics Depot's San Antonio Air Technical Services Command became the San Antonio Air Materiel Area in 1946.

Air Materiel Command
In 1946 AAF Technical Service Command was redesignated Air Materiel Command, and the air technical service commands were reorganized as Air Materiel Areas:
 Marianas Air Materiel Area (Harmon Field, Guam)(active as Provisional formation by August 17, 1948; active February 1, 1949) Under the command of the 19th Bombardment Wing from August 1948 to October 1949.
 Middletown Air Materiel Area (Middletown, Pennsylvania)
 Mobile Air Materiel Area (Brookley Air Force Base, Mobile, Alabama)
 Ogden Air Materiel Area (Hill Field, Utah)
 Oklahoma City Air Materiel Area (Tinker Field, Oklahoma)
 Philippine Air Materiel Area (Nichols Field)
 Rome Air Materiel Area (Rome, New York) (February 1, 1943 – June 25, 1947)
 Sacramento Air Materiel Area (Sacramento, California)
 San Antonio Air Materiel Area (San Antonio, Texas)
 San Bernardino Air Materiel Area (1949–66), at Norton Field, California
 Warner Robins Air Materiel Area (1951–61) at Robins AFB and redesignated Warner Robins Air Logistics Center

Two further Air Materiel Areas were established in the late 1940s and early 1950s:
 Japan Air Materiel Area (JAMA, 1947–1949), at Tachikawa Air Base, replaced by the Far East Air Materiel Command (FEAMCOM).
 Central Air Materiel Area, Europe (CAMAE, 1956–67), at Chateauroux Air Depot in France

The functions of research and development and logistics were operated separately during World War II until they were reunited for several years in the late 1940s under Air Materiel Command. Among its forces was the Air Materiel Force, European Area, which was transferred from USAFE in on January 1, 1956. Air Materiel Force, European Area, at Chateauroux Air Depot, France, and Air Materiel Force, Pacific Area, at Tachikawa Air Base, Japan, were of Numbered Air Force status. Often these formations supervised Air Depot Wings, for example the 75th Air Depot Wing which was based at Chinhae Air Base in South Korea during the Korean War.

In 1950, research and development were split off into a separate formation, the Air Research and Development Command.
From the early 1950s to 1962, the 3079th Aviation Depot Wing under AMC, headquartered at Wright-Patterson Air Force Base, Ohio, was a weapons of mass destruction unit of key strategic importance. It was active until 1962.

In 1961, Air Materiel Command became the Air Force Logistics Command, while the Air Research and Development Command gained responsibility for weapon system acquisition and was renamed the Air Force Systems Command.

Lineage
 Established as Army Air Forces Materiel and Services on July 14, 1944
 Organized as a major command on July 17, 1944
 Redesignated: Army Air Forces Technical Service Command on August 31, 1944
 Redesignated: Air Technical Service Command on July 1, 1945
 Redesignated: Air Materiel Command on March 9, 1946
 Redesignated: Air Force Logistics Command on April 1, 1961
 Inactivated on July 1, 1992

See also
Cheli Air Force Station

References

Further reading
Elliot V. Converse III, Rearming for the Cold War 1945–1960, Government Printing Office
AMC's History Office published Materiel Research and Development in the Army Air Arm, 1914-1945 (November 1946)

United States Army Air Force Commands
Major commands of the United States Air Force
Wright-Patterson Air Force Base
Logistics units and formations of the United States Air Force
Military units and formations established in 1946
Military units and formations disestablished in 1961